Pari 'Koy is a 2015 Philippine television drama series broadcast by GMA Network. It premiered on the network's Telebabad line up from March 9, 2015 to August 21, 2015, replacing More Than Words.

Mega Manila ratings are provided by AGB Nielsen Philippines.

Series overview

Episodes

March 2015

April 2015

May 2015

June 2015

July 2015

August 2015

References

Lists of Philippine drama television series episodes